Etown or E-town may refer to:

 Evanston, a city in northeastern Illinois, home to Northwestern University, commonly referred to as “E-town”.
 Beijing Etown (Chinese: 北京亦庄), a government agency of Beijing that operates a special economic zone for high tech manufacturing and makes investments in technology companies
 A nickname for various communities known as Elizabethtown
Elizabethtown College
eTown, a variety radio program
Edmonton, Alberta, Canada